Hopesay is a civil parish in Shropshire, England.  It contains 27 listed buildings that are recorded in the National Heritage List for England.  Of these, one is listed at Grade I, the highest of the three grades, and the others are at Grade II, the lowest grade.  The parish contains the villages of Hopesay, Aston on Clun, and Broome, and the surrounding countryside.  Most of the listed buildings are houses, cottages, farmhouses, and farm buildings, many of which are timber framed dating from the 15th to the 17th centuries.  The other listed buildings are a church, a bridge, four milestones and a telephone kiosk.


Key

Buildings

References

Citations

Sources

Lists of buildings and structures in Shropshire